Drzymała's wagon was a house on wheels built by peasant Michał Drzymała (1857-1937) as a protest against Imperial Germany's policy of Germanization in its Polish territories. Drzymała was not only able to circumvent German building regulations by moving his home every day, but with his wagon-home, became a Polish folk hero during the Partitions of Poland.

In 1886, by resolution of the Prussian Landtag, a Settlement Commission had been established to encourage German settlement in the Province of Posen and West Prussia. The Commission was empowered to purchase vacant property of the Polish szlachta and sell it to approved German applicants.  The Prussian government regarded this as a measure designed to counteract the German "Flight from the East" (Ostflucht) and reduce the number of Poles. In Polish eyes, the establishment of the Commission was an aggressive measure designed to drive Poles from their lands.  

While the campaign against Polish landownership largely missed its aims, it produced a strong opposition with its own hero, Drzymała. In 1904 he purchased a plot of land in Pogradowitz in the Posen district of Bomst, but found that the newly implemented Prussian Feuerstättengesetz ("furnace law") enabled local officials to deny him as a Pole the permission to build a permanent dwelling with an oven on his land. The law considered any place of stay a house if it stayed in one place for more than 24 hours. To get around the rule, he set himself up in a former circus caravan and for several years tenaciously defied in the courts all attempts to remove him. Each day, Drzymała moved the wagon a short distance, thereby exploiting the loophole and avoiding any legal penalties, until in 1909 he was able to buy an existent farmhouse nearby.  

The case attracted publicity all over Germany.  The German Kulturkampf measures and the Colonization Commission ultimately succeeded in stimulating the Polish national sentiment that they had been designed to suppress.

See also
 Anti-Polish sentiment
 Germanisation of Poles during Partitions
 Kulturkampf
 Spite house

References

Prussian Partition
National symbols of Poland
Germany–Poland relations

pl:Michał Drzymała#Wóz Drzymały